This article details Crewe Alexandra's 2010–11 season in League Two. This was Crewe's 87th competitive season in the English Football League.

Players

Squad information 

Appearances (starts and substitute appearances) and goals include those in the League (and playoffs), FA Cup, League Cup and Football League Trophy.

Squad stats

Disciplinary record

Awards

Individual

Club

Players in and out

In

Out

Club

Coaching staff

Other information

Kits

Competitions

Overall

League Two

Table

Results summary

Results by round

Matches

Pre-Season Friendlies 

Last updated: 2 August 2010

League Two

Football League Cup 

Last updated: 4 September 2010

Football League Trophy

FA Cup

References 
The following references are from crewealex.net, unless otherwise specified.

External links 
 Official Website
 Sky Sports
 BBC Football

Crewe Alexandra
Crewe Alexandra F.C. seasons